KWLP (100.9 FM) is a radio station licensed to serve the community of Peach Springs, Arizona. The station is owned by The Hualapai Tribe and airs a variety format.

The station was assigned the KWLP call letters by the Federal Communications Commission on February 28, 2014.

The Call letters KWLP represent the traditional spelling of the tribes name WaLaPai.

The station originally started up as an internet based radio station known as E-pch "The Peach" designed for youth oriented programming.

References

External links
 Official Website
 

WLP
Radio stations established in 2016
2016 establishments in Arizona
Variety radio stations in the United States
Mohave County, Arizona